Ipsapirone is a selective 5-HT1A receptor partial agonist of the piperazine and azapirone chemical classes. It has antidepressant and anxiolytic effects.  Ipsapirone was studied in several placebo-controlled trials for depression and continues to be used in research.

See also 
 Azapirone

References 

5-HT1A agonists
Alpha-2 blockers
Aminopyrimidines
Anxiolytics
Azapirones
Benzothiazoles
Lactams
Piperazines